Matthias Josef Morys (born 19 March 1987) is a Polish-German former professional football forward.

Career
Born in Gliwice, Silesia, Poland, Morys started his senior career playing for 1. FC Normannia Gmünd in 2005. In 2006, he moved to VfB Stuttgart II, where he played to 2008 scoring 7 goals in 56 matches. It was difficult for Morys to find a regular place in the first team so he moved in Kickers Offenbach. After a season he signed a contract with Bulgarian side Chernomorets Burgas. In December 2010 he was released.

After two years with RB Leipzig, he returned to SG Sonnenhof Großaspach on loan in January 2015.

References

External links

1987 births
Living people
German footballers
Sportspeople from Gliwice
German people of Polish descent
Association football forwards
1. FC Normannia Gmünd players
VfB Stuttgart II players
Kickers Offenbach players
PFC Chernomorets Burgas players
VfR Aalen players
SG Sonnenhof Großaspach players
RB Leipzig players
SC Austria Lustenau players
First Professional Football League (Bulgaria) players
3. Liga players
2. Bundesliga players
Expatriate footballers in Bulgaria
Expatriate footballers in Austria